Karin Kallmaker (born 1960) is an American author of lesbian fiction whose works also include those originally written under the name Laura Adams. Her writings span lesbian romance, lesbian erotica, and lesbian science-fiction/fantasy. Dubbed the Queen of Lesbian Romance, she publishes exclusively in the lesbian market as a matter of personal choice.

Early life and education 
Kallmaker was born in 1960 in Sacramento, California. She graduated from California State University, Sacramento with a B.A. in Business Administration in 1988.

Lesbian romance novels 
Considered a master at characterization, Kallmaker's work reflects the interior lives of her lesbian heroines, set primarily in romance novel situations. "Credible and spirited" protagonists also face contemporary social challenges, resulting in a body of work that reflects lesbian community history since her debut novel, In Every Port (1989), which included events surrounding the assassination of Harvey Milk in 1978. Her second novel, Touchwood, established her as a writer with "a sure sense of the power of language and of the power of eros." Her typical heroine is "the kind of indestructible and talented woman we all dream we could be -- much like Molly Bolt in Rubyfruit Jungle."

In spite of publishing the majority of her work as lesbian romance genre fiction, "there's something original to every book", featuring "complex stories of believable, vulnerable lesbian characters who grow strong through facing tough issues." Deeply influenced by mentor Katherine V. Forrest as an emerging writer, her fifth novel, Painted Moon, was hailed as "the next Curious Wine," and remains one of her most popular novels, fifteen years after its original publication. Crediting Jane Austen as a foremother of the modern novel, Kallmaker's Just Like That is a lesbian version of Pride and Prejudice.

Another homage-by-genre-twist novel is Christabel, inspired by the Samuel Taylor Coleridge poem of the same name. Written initially under the pen name Laura Adams, Kallmaker dedicated the novel to Jeannette Howard Foster for her examination of the lesbian subtext, moving her to retell the story with the women triumphant. Her ability to push the boundaries of genre fiction while maintaining her popularity is epitomized by Maybe Next Time, "an engrossing, compelling story of redemption, healing and surviving," which won a Lambda Literary Award.

Her novels include the Golden Crown Literary Society and Lambda Literary Foundation award-winning 18th & Castro, In Deep Waters 1/2, Just Like That, The Kiss that Counted, Maybe Next Time, and Sugar. Her writing career began with Naiad Press, one of the shaping publishers of lesbian fiction. In 2001, she placed her work as Laura Adams with a new press, Bella Books. After Naiad Press closed in 2003, she moved the remainder of her lesbian romance titles to Bella. In 2008, she joined Bella Books as the press's first Editorial Director, and retired from that position in 2015.

Short stories and essays 
A "cleverly inventive" short story writer, she has published more than five dozen short stories in collections from her own publishers, as well as anthologies from publishers such as Alyson, Regal Crest Enterprises, Circlet Press, Bold Strokes Books, and Haworth Press. The genre of her stories go from vanilla romance to explicit erotica. In a May 2006 interview with Q Syndicate, Kallmaker discussed some of the resistance she faced to the idea that a romance writer could also write erotica. "...Part of my goal for writing erotica was to decriminalize lesbian sex for lesbians, especially those in committed couples and those who don't live in an urban Mecca with an out-and-proud sex-positive attitude." Volumes containing her lesbian erotica short stories have won awards from the Golden Crown Literary Society and the Lambda Literary Foundation.

Published essays have dealt with issues of identity for the author. In 1993, she wrote "When I Grow Up I Want to Be a Lesbian" for Multicultural America: A Resource Book for Teachers of Humanities and American Studies, which explored the disconnect between different stages of coming out, when she first observed the community but did not yet feel a member of it. Ten years later, after the birth of her two children: "For many years I was, by all outward appearances, a suburban married woman." In 2007, in Love, Castro Street, her essay "Where One Size Fits All" concluded the award-winning anthology with "No matter what my clothing of the day might be, from a shy writer offering to sign her first novel to a seeming soccer mom with two kids in tow, Castro Street has never refused me entry. The potholes, the crowds, the scary traffic are still there, but somehow the street is larger than ever."

Science fiction and fantasy novels as Laura Adams 
As Laura Adams, Kallmaker has written lesbian science-fiction and fantasy titles that include a "chilling brush with reality." Though the novels include strong lesbian romance storylines, their themes revolve around the power of lesbian community and spirituality.

Writing career 
Kallmaker has 18 years of experience with non-profit financial management. Workplaces, such as an association of home and health care service providers to the elderly, a private lender investing in projects to benefit low income people, and a half-year at an oil refinery, have provided background for many of her novels.

 In Every Port (1990)
 Touchwood (1991)
 Paperback Romance (1992)
 Car Pool (1993)
 Painted Moon (1994)
 Wild Things (1996)
 Embrace in Motion (1997)
 Night Vision (1997) (writing as Laura Adams)
 Christabel (1998) (writing as Laura Adams)
 Making Up for Lost Time (1998)
 Watermark (1999)
 The Dawning (1999) (writing as Laura Adams)
 Unforgettable (2000)
 Frosting on the Cake (2001) (short stories)
 Tunnel of Light 1: Sleight of Hand (2001) (writing as Laura Adams)
 Substitute for Love (2001)
 Tunnel of Light 2: Seeds of Fire (2002) (writing as Laura Adams)
 Maybe Next Time (2003)
 All the Wrong Places (2004)
 New Exploits 1: Once Upon a Dyke (2004) (with Johnson, Szymanski, Watts)
 One Degree of Separation (2004)
 Sugar (2004)
 Just Like That (2005)
 New Exploits 2: Bell, Book and Dyke (2005) (with Johnson, Szymanski, Watts)
 18th & Castro (2006) (short stories)
 New Exploits 3: Stake through the Heart (2006) (with Johnson, Szymanski, Watts)
 Finders Keepers (2006)
 New Exploits 4: Tall in the Saddle (2007) (with Johnson, Szymanski, Watts)
 In Deep Waters 1: Cruising the Seas (2007) (with Radclyffe)
 Christabel (Second Edition)(2008)
 In Deep Waters 2: Cruising the Strip (2008) (with Radclyffe)
 The Kiss That Counted (2008)
 Warming Trend (2009)
 Stepping Stone (2009)
 Above Temptation (2010)
 Roller Coaster (2011)
 Love by the Numbers (2013)
 Captain of Industry (2016)
 Castle Wrath (2017)
 My Lady Lipstick (2018)
 Because I Said So (2019)
 Simply the Best (2021)

Works in translation and other formats 

Numerous novels have been translated for distribution in France (KTM Editions), Germany (Verlag Krug & Schadenberg), Spain (Egales) and the Czech Republic (LePress). Some titles have also been acquired for hardcover editions by InsightOut Book Club, a division of the Quality Paperback Book Club. Most of her titles are also available in e-Book format. A complete listing of works in translation is available on the author's website.

Awards 
 2020 - Because I Said So – Golden Crown Literary Award Winner, Lesbian Contemporary Romance
 2019 - My Lady Lipstick – Golden Crown Literary Award Winner, Lesbian Romantic Blend
 2011 - Above Temptation – Golden Crown Literary Award Winner, Lesbian Romantic Suspense
 2011 - Frosting on the Cake 2 – Golden Crown Literary Award Winner, Lesbian Anthology/Short Story
 2010 - Stepping Stone – Lambda Literary Award Finalist, Lesbian Romance
 2009 - The Kiss that Counted – Lambda Literary Award Winner, Lesbian Romance
 2009 - The Kiss that Counted – Golden Crown Literary Award Winner, Ann Bannon Popular Choice
 2009 - In Deep Waters 2: Cruising the Strip - Lambda Literary Award Winner, Lesbian Erotica co-authored with Radclyffe
 2008 - In Deep Waters 1: Cruising the Seas - Golden Crown Literary Award Winner, Lesbian Erotica co-authored with Radclyffe
 2008 - Finders Keepers - Golden Crown Literary Award Finalist, Lesbian Romance
 2008 - Finders Keepers - Golden Crown Literary Award Finalist, Ann Bannon Popular Choice
 2007 - 18th & Castro – Golden Crown Literary Award Winner, Lesbian Erotica
 2007 - 18th & Castro – Lambda Literary Award Finalist, LGBTQ Erotica
 2007 - Finders Keepers – Lambda Literary Award Finalist, Lesbian Romance
 2006 - Just Like That – Golden Crown Literary Award Winner, Lesbian Romance
 2006 - New Exploits 2: Bell, Book and Dyke - Golden Crown Literary Award Finalist, Lesbian Fantasy co-authored with Julia Watts, Therese Szymanski and Barbara Johnson
 2006 - All the Wrong Places –Golden Crown Literary Award Finalist, Lesbian Romance
 2006 - All the Wrong Places – Lambda Literary Award Finalist, Lesbian Erotica
 2006 - All the Wrong Places – Lambda Literary Award Finalist, Lesbian Romance
 2005 - Sugar - Golden Crown Literary Award Winner, Lesbian Romance
 2005 - New Exploits 1: Once Upon a Dyke - Lambda Literary Award Finalist, Fantasy co-authored with Julia Watts, Therese Szymanski and Barbara Johnson
 2004 - Maybe Next Time – Lambda Literary Award Winner, Romance
 2003 - Tunnel of Light 2: Seeds of Fire - Lambda Literary Award Finalist, Fantasy
 2002 - Substitute for Love - Lambda Literary Award Finalist, Romance

Other recognitions 
 2004 Alice B Medal - The Alice B Readers Award for body of work
 2008 Selected as guest lecturer, Distinguished Author Series, Stonewall Library and Archives
 2008 LJ Maas Memorial Award for mentorship of new and emerging writers
 2011 Golden Crown Literary Society Trailblazer Award

Personal 
Kallmaker and her partner of more than 30 years reside in the San Francisco Bay Area. They were married on August 25, 2008, and are the mothers of two children, Kelson and Eleanor.

References

External links 
A complete listing of short stories and essays in anthologies is available on the author's website.
Karin Kallmaker's Official Website Kallmaker Biographical Information and Full Bibliography. Retrieved on 2008-05-31.
Goldie Award Winners Golden Crown Literary Society.
Lambda Literary Foundation. Retrieved on 2008-05-31.
  Publisher's home page
 Gay Power, Lesbian Lust and Literary Trash, San Francisco Bay Times, 9/21/2006 
 In Their Own Words: Lesbian Writers on their Inspiration, AfterEllen.com, 5/26/2008 
Readings and Lectures by author on video

1960 births
20th-century American women writers
21st-century American women writers
American women novelists
American romantic fiction writers
Lambda Literary Award winners
American lesbian writers
Living people
American women short story writers
20th-century American novelists
Writers from Sacramento, California
Writers from California
California State University, Sacramento alumni
American LGBT novelists
LGBT people from California
Women romantic fiction writers
20th-century American short story writers
21st-century short story writers